Elections to Bolton Metropolitan Borough Council were held on 22 May 2014, along with the European Parliament elections, 2014. One third of the council was up for election, with each successful candidate to serve a four-year term of office, expiring in 2018.

21 seats were contested, including 2 seats in the Horwich and Blackrod ward following the resignation of Labour councillor Lindsey Kell. The Labour Party won 13 seats, the Conservatives won 5 seats, UKIP won 2 seats and the Liberal Democrats won 1 seat.

After the election, the total composition of the council was as follows:
Labour 40
Conservative 15
UK Independence Party 2
Liberal Democrats 3

Election result

Council Composition
Prior to the election the composition of the council was:

After the election the composition of the council was:

LD - Liberal Democrats
U - UKIP

Ward results

Astley Bridge ward

Bradshaw ward

Breightmet ward

Bromley Cross ward

Crompton ward

Farnworth ward

Great Lever ward

Halliwell ward

Harper Green ward

Heaton and Lostock ward

Horwich and Blackrod ward 
Two seats were up for election. Stephen Pickup will have to stand again for election in 2016 and Alan Bury in 2018.

Horwich North East ward

Hulton ward

Kearsley ward

Little Lever and Darcy Lever ward

Rumworth ward

Smithills ward

Tonge with the Haulgh ward

Westhoughton North and Chew Moor ward

Westhoughton South ward

References

2014
2014 English local elections
2010s in Greater Manchester